James Williams (8 June 1882–1960) was an English footballer who played in the Football League for West Bromwich Albion.

References

1882 births
1960 deaths
English footballers
Association football defenders
English Football League players
Aston Villa F.C. players
West Bromwich Albion F.C. players